The Workers Educational Society Napred was a socialist organization founded in Slovakia in February 1869. It was under the direct influence of a similar organization in Vienna. Napred represented the first emergence of the socialist movement in Slovakia.

References

Organisations based in Slovakia